I Loved Yesterday is the third album of Japanese singer-songwriter YUI, and was released on 9 April 2008. The album peaked at number twenty-three on the Billboard Japan Top 100. I Loved Yesterday has been certified double platinum by RIAJ for shipment of 500,000 copies in Japan.

The 1st track, "Laugh Away" which is the lead song for the album is released as a 1st digital single on March 10, 2008, which is used as the theme song for the Glico "Watering KissMint" commercial and the 10th track, "Oh Yeah: YUI Acoustic Version" is, later, also released as another digital single on May 25, 2008, which is used as the opening theme song to the morning Japanese show Mezamashi TV.

The album title, I Loved Yesterday's message is "Kinou wo aiseru youni kyou wo ikiyou. Ashita mo onaji kimochi de itai kara" (昨日を　愛せるように　今日を　生きよう　　明日も　同じ気持ちで　いたいから) which means in English, "In order to love yesterday, let's live today without regrets. I want to live tomorrow with the same feeling as well".

Track listing 
Regular Edition

 Limited Edition
Regular Edition + DVD

Charts and sales

Oricon sales charts (Japan)

References

Yui (singer) albums
2008 albums
Sony Music Entertainment Japan albums
Japanese-language albums